In the APG IV system (2016) for the classification of flowering plants, the name asterids denotes a clade (a monophyletic group). Asterids is the largest group of flowering plants, with more than 80,000 species, about a third of the total flowering plant species. Well-known plants in this clade include the common daisy, forget-me-nots, nightshades (including potatoes, eggplants, tomatoes, chili peppers and tobacco), the common sunflower, petunias, yacon, morning glory, sweet potato, coffee, lavender, lilac, olive, jasmine, honeysuckle, ash tree, teak, snapdragon, sesame, psyllium, garden sage, table herbs such as mint, basil, and rosemary, and rainforest trees such as Brazil nut.

Most of the taxa belonging to this clade had been referred to as Asteridae in the Cronquist system (1981) and as Sympetalae in earlier systems.  The name asterids (not necessarily capitalised) resembles the earlier botanical name but is intended to be the name of a clade rather than a formal ranked name, in the sense of the ICBN.

History
Genetic analysis carried out after APG II maintains that the sister to all other asterids are the Cornales. A second order that split from the base of the asterids are the Ericales. The remaining orders cluster into two clades, the lamiids and the campanulids. The structure of both of these clades has changed in APG III.

In the APG III system, the following clades were renamed:
 euasterids I → lamiids
 euasterids II → campanulids

Phylogeny
The phylogenetic tree presented hereinafter has been proposed by the APG IV project.

Subdivision
Lamiids
The lamiid subclade consists of about 40,000 species and account for about 15% of angiosperm diversity, characterized in general by superior ovaries and corollas with any fusion of the petals occurring late in the process of development. The major part of lamiid diversity occurs in the group of five orders from Boraginales to Solanales, referred to informally as "core lamiids" (sometimes called Laminae), although Vahliales consists of the single small genus Vahlia. The remainder of the lamiids are referred to as "basal lamiids", in which Garryales is the sister group to the core lamiids. It has been suggested that the core lamiids radiated from an ancestral line of tropical trees in which the flowers were inconspicuous and the fruit large, drupaceous and often single-seeded.

See also
 List of lamiid families
 List of basal asterid families

References

Bibliography

External links

Asterids in Stevens, P. F. (2001 onwards). Angiosperm Phylogeny Website. Version 7, May 2006.

 
Plant unranked clades